Matamata is a town in Waikato, North Island, New Zealand. It may subsequently refer to:
 Matamata-Piako District, territorial authority for Matamata
 Matamata Airport
 Matamata College, secondary school
 Matamata Swifts, football club
 Matamata (New Zealand electorate), former parliamentary electorate